E. intermedia  may refer to:
 Enispe intermedia, a butterfly species found in South Asia
 Ephedra intermedia, a plant species native to Southwest and Central Asia
 Erebus intermedia, a moth species found in Asia
 Eumorpha intermedia, the intermediate sphinx, a moth species found in North Carolina, Florida, Mississippi, Louisiana and South Texas
 Erebus intermedia, a sedge species native to Eastern North America; commonly known as Matted Spikerush.

Synonyms
 Epipactis intermedia, a synonym for Epipactis microphylla, the small-leaved helleborine, an orchid species
 Eucalyptus intermedia, a synonym for Corymbia intermedia, the pink bloodwood, a plant species native to Queensland and New South Wales

See also
 Intermedia (disambiguation)